Lunugala is a town in the Sri Lankan province of Uva.There are 28 Grama Niladhari Divisions in the Lunugala Divisional Secretariat Division

The town is placed in middle of a mountain range. It was called "Pattipola" (පට්ටිපොල) in the past.
Its main agricultural product is tea. There are many beautiful tea estates in Lunugala as Adawatta Estate, Park Estate, Hopton Estate, Showlands Estate and Madolsima Plantation. Additionally people cultivate pepper, cinnamon and cacao.

Society & Population Distribution 

Basically the society of lunugala consists of three major types—Sinhala, Tamil and Muslims. These people live peacefully together. In some places there are cross marriages as Tamil-Muslims, Muslim-Sinhala and Tamil-Sinhala.

Schools 

Lunugala Central College
Yapamma Sri Dhammananda Vidyalaya
Rama Krishna College
kalai mahal tamil maha vidyalayam 
Muslim School
Jayabima Primary school

Religious places 

Lunugala Sri Lonagiri Purana Rajamaha Viharaya
Yapamma Sri Ramya Vijayarama Viharaya
Lunugala Sri Kadireshan Kovil
Lunugala Jumma Mosque
Lunugala Catholic Church

Hospitals 

Lunugala Hospital 
hopton Hospital 
Adawatta Dispensary

Public banks 

Bank of Ceylon
Peoples Bank
Regional Development Bank

Gallery

References 
 Madulsima, a top tourist attraction  by M.H.M.N. Bandara

Populated places in Uva Province